Cambarellus blacki, the cypress crayfish, is a species of crayfish in family Cambaridae. It is endemic to Florida.

References

Cambaridae
Endemic fauna of Florida
Freshwater crustaceans of North America
Taxonomy articles created by Polbot
Crustaceans described in 1980
Taxa named by Horton H. Hobbs Jr.